The Ottoman Turkish magazine Eşref was published weekly from 1909 to 1910 in a total of 26 editions. The content direction was largely limited to literary themes as well as satirical portrayals and texts. The publisher was Selanik Publishing House. The magazine was headquartered in Istanbul.

References

1909 establishments in the Ottoman Empire
1910 disestablishments in the Ottoman Empire
Defunct literary magazines
Defunct magazines published in Turkey
Magazines established in 1909
Magazines disestablished in 1910
Magazines published in Istanbul
Turkish-language magazines
Literary magazines published in Turkey
Satirical magazines published in Turkey
Weekly magazines published in Turkey